Duane Eddy Washington Sr. (born August 31, 1964) is an American former professional basketball player who played in the National Basketball Association (NBA).

Early life
Washington is a graduate of Parkview Arts and Science Magnet High School.

College career
Washington played at Laredo Junior College in Laredo, Texas, and Middle Tennessee State University.

Professional career
Washington was the 13th pick of the second round of the 1987 NBA draft by the Washington Bullets. Washington's brief NBA career consisted of 19 games spanning two seasons: he played during the 1987–88 season with the New Jersey Nets.

In October 1988, while a member of the Nets, Washington was suspended for two years for violating the substance-abuse agreement.

In 1989, he won the CBA championship with the Tulsa Fast Breakers.

During the 1992–93 season, Washington played with the Los Angeles Clippers.

Washington also played professionally overseas with stints in France, Spain, Colombia, Venezuela, Israel and Germany.

Legal issues
On September 19, 2012, he was charged with failing to stop at the scene of an accident causing injury after allegedly hitting a 70-year-old woman with his car on September 18 and leaving the scene of the accident. The accident occurred along I-96 in Crockery Township, Michigan, near Spring Lake. In July 2013, Washington was sentenced to sixty days in jail. He was also placed under probation for eighteen months and ordered to perform community service.

Personal life
Washington is the older brother of basketball coach and former player Derek Fisher and the father of professional basketball player Duane Washington Jr., who currently plays for the Phoenix Suns of the NBA.

References

External links
 College & NBA stats @ basketballreference.com

1964 births
Living people
20th-century African-American sportspeople
21st-century African-American people
African-American basketball players
American expatriate basketball people in Colombia
American expatriate basketball people in France
American expatriate basketball people in Germany
American expatriate basketball people in Israel
American expatriate basketball people in Spain
American expatriate basketball people in Venezuela
American men's basketball players
Basketball players from Arkansas
CB Granada players
CB Murcia players
Columbus Horizon players
Doping cases in basketball
Grand Rapids Hoops players
Grand Rapids Mackers players
Junior college men's basketball players in the United States
Le Mans Sarthe Basket players
Liga ACB players
Los Angeles Clippers players
Maccabi Rishon LeZion basketball players
Middle Tennessee Blue Raiders men's basketball players
National Basketball Association players banned for drug offenses
New Jersey Nets players
Panteras de Miranda players
People from Eschwege
Sportspeople from Kassel (region)
People from Laredo, Texas
Rapid City Thrillers players
Shooting guards
Skyliners Frankfurt players
Sportspeople from Little Rock, Arkansas
Trotamundos B.B.C. players
Tulsa Fast Breakers players
United States Basketball League players
Washington Bullets draft picks